Réda Bensaïd Sayah (born June 19, 1989 in Ouargla) is an Algerian football player. He currently plays for MC Alger in the Algerian Ligue Professionnelle 1.

Club career
In July 2011, Sayah signed a two-year contract with MC Alger. He was originally spotted by the club when they faced his previous club, MC Mekhadma, in the second round of the 2010–11 Algerian Cup. On September 20, 2011, he made his professional debut for the club as an 87th-minute substitute in a league match against ES Sétif.

References

External links
 
 

1989 births
Algerian Ligue Professionnelle 1 players
Algerian footballers
MC Alger players
People from Ouargla
Living people
MC Mekhadma players
Association football forwards
21st-century Algerian people